Velvet Belly is a Norwegian pop band from Kristiansand.

Biography 
The band started as a trio in 1989, and was joined by vocalist Anne Marie Almedal the following year. Her vocal was wrapped in a vague and melancholy soundscape dominated by synthesizers, programming and sampling to the band's regular producer Erik Honoré. They released two albums before they got a better reception with their third album Window Tree in 1994. The album landed them a contract with BMG which re-released the album with a new cover with Europe as a market.

Vidar Ersfjord, playing the keyboard joined the band for the album Lucia which was released in 1997, this album was awarded the Norwegian Spellemannprisen in the category for best pop group. The band has cooperated with the musician and songwriter Erik Honoré, and he has been the producer for all their albums.

Honors 
1997: Spellemannprisen in the category Pop band for the album Lucia

Band members 
 Kay Rune Rasmussen drums, piano
 Tor Henning Leh guitar
 Pål Aanensen bass-guitar, piano
 Anne Marie Almedal vocals
 Vidar Ersfjord keyboard

Discography 
 Colours (1992) (released again with new cover by BMG in 1995)
 Little Lies (1993)
 Window Tree (1994, and a new release on BMG, 1995)
 The Landing (BMG, 1996)
 Lucia (BMG, 1997) (European and Japanese releases, with different cover art; Japanese release includes The Man With the Child in His Eyes, a cover of the Kate Bush song)
 Velvet Belly (Playground, 2003) double-album

References

External links 
Biography from Norwegian Pop and Rock Encyclopedia

Norwegian pop music groups
Spellemannprisen winners
Musical groups established in 1989
1989 establishments in Norway
Musical groups from Kristiansand